Vladislav Trushkin (born May 5, 1993) is a Russian professional basketball player who plays for BC Enisey of the VTB United League.

Professional career
Trushkin started his professional career in 2010 with Spartak Vidnoye Moscow. He later played for several Russian clubs, including Dynamo Moscow, Spartak Primorye, Enisey. He signed a contract for 2017–18 season with UNICS Kazan.

In the summer of 2018, Trushkin signed a one-year contract with Zenit Saint Petersburg. In June 2019, he signed a two-year contract extension with the club.

References

External links
 Vladislav Trushkin at eurobasket.com
 Vladislav Trushkin at euroleague.net

1993 births
Living people
BC Zenit Saint Petersburg players
Power forwards (basketball)
Russian men's basketball players
Small forwards